The 2001–02 Washington State Cougars men's basketball team represented Washington State University for the 2001–02 NCAA Division I men's basketball season. Led by third-year head coach Paul Graham, the Cougars were members of the Pacific-10 Conference and played their home games on campus at Beasley Coliseum in Pullman, Washington.

The conference tournament, last played in 1990, resumed this year, but only the top eight teams qualified.

References

External links
Sports Reference – Washington State Cougars: 2001–02 basketball season

Washington State Cougars men's basketball seasons
Washington State Cougars
Washington State
Washington State